C Joseph Lanzbom is a Grammy winning American guitarist and songwriter. He is known for co-founding the band Inasense (later renamed Soulfarm), with Noah Chase.

Personal background 
Lanzbom grew up in Lakewood Township, New Jersey, where he studied music and jazz guitar privately. He then went to the University of Miami to formally study composition and theory. Influences include Charlie Christian, BB King, Duane Allman, Pat Metheny, and T Bone Burnett.

Professional background 
In 1991, Lanzbom established the band Inasense (later renamed Soulfarm), with Noah Chase. Together, they released more than  ten albums. Lanzbom is the founder of Sherwood Ridge Studio, located in Pomona, New York. He has worked with Shlomo Carlebach, Perry Farrell of Jane's Addiction, Jeff Haynes, T Lavitz, Dave Eggar, and American Idol finalist Crystal Bowersox. He served as an engineer guitarist and songwriter on Pete Seeger's album Tomorrow's Children, for which he won a Grammy Award in 2011. Lanzbom played guitar on and mixed Seeger and Bruce Springsteen's "God's Counting on Me, God's Counting on You". He also Co founded the band Deadgrass in 2016 to present .

Discography

References

External links
 C Lanzbom's Home Page
 Soulfarm Home Page

Jewish singers
Jewish American musicians
People from Lakewood Township, New Jersey
People from Pomona, New York
University of Miami Frost School of Music alumni
Jewish rock
Jewish rock musicians
Soulfarm members